Layer Cake (also occasionally stylised as L4YER CAKƐ on some poster artwork) is a 2004 British crime film directed by Matthew Vaughn, in his directorial debut. The screenplay was adapted by J. J. Connolly from his 2000 novel of the same name. The film's plot revolves around a London-based criminal, played by Daniel Craig, who works in the cocaine trade and wishes to leave the drug business. The film also features Tom Hardy, Colm Meaney, and Sienna Miller. Craig's character is unnamed in the film and is listed in the credits as "XXXX."

The film was produced by Adam Bohling, David Reid and Matthew Vaughn, with Stephen Marks as executive producer. The title refers to the social strata, especially in the British criminal underworld.

Plot
The protagonist XXXX (otherwise unnamed) is a London cocaine distributor who abhors violence and operates with the care and professionalism of a legitimate businessman. His chief associates are his enforcer and partner Morty, and Gene, an Irish gangster who serves as his liaison to mob boss Jimmy Price. Just as XXXX is ready to retire from criminal life, he is summoned to a lunch meeting with Jimmy, who gives him two tasks.

The first is to track down Charlie, the drug-addicted runaway daughter of one of Price's associates. XXXX enlists the con men Cody and Tiptoes to find her; they learn that Charlie has apparently been kidnapped, but are unable to discover who abducted her.

The second task is for XXXX to oversee the purchase of one million ecstasy tablets from the "Duke", a low-level criminal who recently returned to London from Amsterdam with his girlfriend Slasher and crew of thugs led by his right-hand man Gazza. Unbeknownst to XXXX, the Duke and his crew have stolen the pills from a gang of Serbian war criminals. He meets the Duke's feckless nephew, Sidney, and finds himself attracted to his girlfriend Tammy. XXXX tries to broker the sale of the pills to Liverpool gangsters Trevor and Shanks but they refuse, informing him of their origin and that the vengeful Serbians have sent the assassin Dragan to recover the pills and kill the thieves. As the Duke had mentioned his name to the Serbians, XXXX is also a target.

XXXX arranges a tryst with Tammy but is kidnapped and brought to Eddie Temple, a wealthy crime lord. Eddie explains that Charlie is his daughter, whom he has recovered; Jimmy, having recently lost a fortune due to bad investments he blames on Eddie, wanted her as a hostage until Eddie recouped his losses. Eddie gives XXXX a recording, revealing that Jimmy has been working as an informant for Scotland Yard, planning to betray XXXX to the police once the pills were sold in exchange for immunity for his own crimes and XXXX's money. Eddie demands that XXXX sell him the pills instead.

XXXX assassinates Jimmy at his home, but later finds that his accountant, an associate of Jimmy's, has vanished along with XXXX's money. Confronted by Gene and Morty, he shares the evidence of Jimmy's betrayal, and the pair acknowledge him as the new acting boss. Gene shows them the corpse of the Duke, who was killed by one of his men when Slasher threatened to go to the cops if Jimmy did not help them out of their situation. XXXX hires a hitman to ambush and kill Dragan, but he kills the hitman first and makes XXXX promise to recover the pills.

Sidney brings XXXX to Duke's old hideout, and, as he tries to bargain with Gazza for the pills, the police arrive. XXXX and the Duke's gang barely escape the raid, while Dragan watches from afar as the pills are confiscated. However, it turns out that XXXX arranged for the raid, with Cody and Tiptoes posing as officers to secure the pills. XXXX delivers the Duke's severed head to Dragan as a peace offering; satisfied, Dragan reports to the Serbians that the police have seized the drugs. The Serbians accept the loss, which is revealed to be a small amount in comparison to their overall manufacturing capacity.

When XXXX and his crew arrive at Eddie's warehouse to sell the pills as arranged, Eddie's henchmen relieve them of the drugs at gunpoint, and Eddie welcomes him to the "layer cake" of criminal hierarchy. Having anticipated this double-cross, XXXX arranges Trevor and Shanks to gun down Eddie's men in an armed robbery, take the drugs, and sell them so he can settle his accounts. The gang assembles for lunch at the Stoke Park Country Club, honouring their new boss; however, XXXX declines their offer of leadership and follows through on his initial plan to retire. With Tammy on his arm, he exits the club, but is shot by the jilted yet apologetic Sidney. He collapses, bleeding out on the steps.

Cast

Production
Filming began in June 2003. Queen's Gate Mews in South Kensington, London, was used as the filming location for the home of Daniel Craig's main character.

Soundtrack
The soundtrack from Layer Cake comprises 14 tracks. 

 "Hayling" – FC Kahuna
 "Opening" – Ilan Eshkeri and Steve McLaughlin
 "She Sells Sanctuary" – The Cult
 "Can't Get You Out of My Head" (Original Radio Edit) – Kylie Minogue
 "You Got the Love" (Original bootleg radio mix) – The Source feat. Candi Staton
 "Drive to the Boatyard" – Ilan Eshkeri
 "Junky Fight" – Lisa Gerrard
 "Making Plans for Nigel" – XTC
 "Ordinary World" – Duran Duran
 "Ruthless Gravity" – Craig Armstrong
 "Four to the Floor" (Soulsavers Mix) – Starsailor
 "Drive to the Warehouse" – Ilan Eshkeri and Lisa Gerrard
 "Aria" (Layer Cake Speech) – Lisa Gerrard with Michael Gambon
 "Don't Let Me Be Misunderstood" – Joe Cocker

The Rolling Stones song "Gimme Shelter" also features in the film but does not appear on the soundtrack album.

Release

Box office

Home media
Layer Cake was released on DVD and VHS on 23 August 2005 and on Blu-ray in 2007. It was also re-released in 2014.

Reception and legacy
Layer Cake received positive reviews, with an 80% "Certified fresh" rating on Rotten Tomatoes and an average of 7.03/10 based on 141 reviews. The critical consensus states that it is "A stylized, electric British crime thriller". On Metacritic it has a weighted average score of 73% based on 30 reviews.

Roger Ebert of the Chicago Sun-Times remarked, "The movie was directed by Matthew Vaughn, who produced Lock, Stock and Two Smoking Barrels and Snatch, and this one works better than those films because it doesn't try so hard to be clever and tries harder to be menacing". Of Craig's performance, he said, "Craig is fascinating here as a criminal who is very smart, and finds that it is not an advantage because while you might be able to figure out what another smart person is about to do, dumbos like the men he works for are likely to do anything". He gave the film 3.5 out of 4 stars. Mick LaSalle of the San Francisco Chronicle remarked on the "efficient, gripping story" and wrote that Craig's performance as an improvising, "intelligent amateur" contained the "cool-yet-humble vibe of Steve McQueen". Owen Gleiberman of Entertainment Weekly gave it a grade A, calling it a "Fast, convulsive, and densely exciting new British gangster thriller". Leslie Felperin of Variety wrote: "There's a proper lived-in believability about Layer Cake's depiction of how the worlds of the rich, the criminal and the criminally rich intersect."

Craig's starring role in the film has been cited as the performance that led to his high-profile casting as James Bond.

Awards and accolades

Future
Jason Statham's production company is said to have the rights to produce a sequel, entitled Viva La Madness with Statham taking the lead role from Craig. On 17 September 2015, it was reported that Viva La Madness will be a TV show for Gaumont International Television.

References

External links

 
 
 
 
 BBC interview with Matthew Vaughn

2004 films
2004 crime drama films
2004 crime thriller films
2004 thriller drama films
British crime drama films
British crime thriller films
British gangster films
British heist films
Films about drugs
Films about murderers
Films based on British novels
Films directed by Matthew Vaughn
Films scored by Ilan Eshkeri
Films set in London
Sony Pictures Classics films
Films produced by Matthew Vaughn
Films about the Serbian Mafia
2004 directorial debut films
2000s English-language films
2004 independent films
2000s British films